A referendum on taking military action to conquer the breakaway United Suvadive Republic was held in the Maldives in March 1959. The proposal was approved by voters.

References

1959 referendums
Referendums in the Maldives
1959 in the Maldives
March 1959 events in Asia
United Suvadive Republic